Beirut Terraces is a residential skyscraper in the Central district of downtown Beirut, Lebanon. It is located at 1399 Fouad Najjar Street in the Minet el-Hosn neighborhood, south of the Platinum Tower. The building construction started in 2011 and finished in 2017. It was developed by Benchmark and designed by Herzog & de Meuron Architekten.

Design
The building design was inspired by the classic and contemporary history of Beirut. It has a unique architectural design, which is characterized by its terraces and overhangs that were projected differently, thus forming a stack of layers building shape. This creates a harmony between the building and the cityscape.

The overhangs also provide shade and reduce solar gain. To facilitate the facades construction and upkeep, while also create terraces and protect the tenants from direct heat, the slabs of each floor were extended around their perimeter by at least  and sustained by columns at the corners of the building. Daily temperature cycles are also balanced by the slabs' thermal mass. As a result, this system made the building design sustainable for a living.

See also
 List of tallest buildings in Lebanon

References

Buildings and structures completed in 2017
Buildings and structures in Beirut
Apartment buildings